Walter Scott of Buccleuch is the name of several successive Lords of Buccleuch in the Scottish border country:

Sir Walter Scott of Buccleuch (d. 1469)
Sir Walter Scott of Branxholme and Buccleuch (murdered 1552)
Sir Walter Scott, 4th Baron of Buccleuch (d. 1574)
Sir Walter Scott, 1st Lord Scott of Buccleuch, the "Bold Buccleuch" (1565–1611)
Sir Walter Scott, 1st Earl of Buccleuch, (d. 1633), created Earl of Buccleuch in 1619

See also
 Duke of Buccleuch
 Clan Scott
 Walter Scott (disambiguation)